is a Japanese animated science fiction adventure film, and the first Doraemon film to be released during the Reiwa era. It celebrates 50 years of the Doraemon franchise, alongside Stand by Me Doraemon 2. The screenplay for Doraemon: Nobita's New Dinosaur is written by Genki Kawamura, who produced Your Name, The Boy and the Beast and Weathering with You.

The film was originally scheduled to be released in Japan on 6 March 2020. However, due to the COVID-19 pandemic in Japan, it was postponed to 7 August 2020.

Plot 
Nobita visits a dinosaur exhibition with his friend. In a fossil excavation experience there, he vows to his friends that he will discover a dinosaur and says that he will eat monkey nuts with his eyes if he fails. As he leaves the excavation experience, he trips over a rock and suspects that he has found the fossil of an egg.  He goes home and convinces Doraemon to use the "time wrapping cloth" on the fossil egg, and twin feathered dinosaurs emerged. Doraemon found that they are a new species of dinosaur not listed in the "Complete Encyclopæpia of Space". Nobita names the twin dinosaurs Kyu and Myu and under the advice of Dr. Dinosaur learned how to take care of them. The two fast-growing creatures gradually show differences in their development. Myu has learned to fly, but not the smaller Ky. As Kyu and Myu grow, Nobita's room becomes too small for them, so they use the "Breeding Diorama Set" to give Kyu and Myu more freedom. The day when Nobita completes his dare arrive. When his friends arrive, they discovr that Nobita has indeed found a dinosaur. At this point, Kyu and Myu make a lot of commotion, leading to Nobita's mother to come upstairs. They try to hide Kyu and Myu by using the "spatial movement crayon", however, the townspeople see Kyu and Myu. Understanding that Kyu and Myu have reached their full size, they should return to their time. Nobita has trouble accepting this, but decides it might be the best option. The next morning, the five of them climb into the time machine.

With the "Time Furoshiki" Doraemon's party goes back to the late Cretaceous, calculated from the time of the fossil egg. However, they discovered they were in the Jurassic period instead. As they are rushing to return to the "time machine" Nobita tripped and lost the "Breeding diorama set" in a swamp. The scene switches to a room where the actions of Nobita and his friends are secretly monitored by Jill, in the form of a white monkey, as he answers a call by a mysterious woman named Natalie. Unaware that they are being monitored, the group searches for Kyu and Myu's comrades, and finally reaches the sea where along the way dinosaurs like Cole, a Tarbosaurus who originally attacked them, and Top, a Sinoceratops, joined during the voyage as both were tamed by "Tomodachi Chocolate". When Gian and Suneo went ahead to find more clues about Kyu and Myu's kind, they are captured by Jill, and Doraemon and others are in danger of being attacked by a large pterosaur. Nobita and Kyu fall into the sea, but are helped by a plesiosaur that is suspiously similar to Piisuke who took them to a mysterious island where they reunite with Doraemon, Shizuka, and Myu. This is an island inhabited by dinosaurs that look like them, the same species as Kyu and Myu. Nobita tries to get the two back to their group, but Kyu is scratched and refused by the group because they believe Kyu is different. It may be because, unlike the new dinosaurs, Kyu cannot fly and its tail is shorter. Trembling with grief and sorrow, Nobita declares that Kyu can fly by itself.

Meanwhile, Jill and Natalie, who were on their way to the island on a submarine, said a deep impact was immediate. Gian and Suneo, who are watching them escape from the cage, look at the map and see the truth of the mysterious island. At the time, Nobita and Kyu, who had just started flying training, had a misunderstanding and the training was disrupted. Nobita looked down, silently encouraged, and when he searched for a note with the "question stick" there was a figure of a mark who was constantly practicing alone. He started training to touch Nobita because he was able to do the reverse climb. At that moment, a huge object shining in the sky falls.

Gian and Suneo also ran further in, when they were all together, Doraemon tells everyone that this was the time period that caused the Cretaceous extinction when a meteorite struck Mexico on the Yucatán Peninsula 66 million years ago. Nobita tries to use an "opposite direction" to turn the meteorite into space, but the "Time Patrol" appears and Natalie stops the party's activities. Jill reveals that they were looking at this era as a one-time patrol, and insists that history cannot be changed even if he thinks about dinosaurs and is close to Nobita's heart.  Nonetheless, Nobita, who tried to use the "opposite direction" machine, was stopped and detained by the Time Patrol. Kyu and Myu rush to protect Nobita, and Doraemon and others who tried to protect him are also detained. However, when Jill holds a "check card" on Nobita and Kyu, the card emits light. Jill and his Time Patrol group decide not to interfere in their activities.

As the team fights to help Kyu, Myu and the other dinosaurs, information provided by Gian and Suneo revealed that the island was actually the "Breeding diorama set", dropped by Nobita during their time in the Jurassic period, and became active and larger as time passed. They decided to move the dinosaurs outside the island onto the island with the "Space Movement Crayon" and launch a rescue operation to protect them from the hot air of the meteorite collision with the Diorama's "weather control function". As the meteorites approach, the pterosaur strikes Nobita and Doraemon as they are drawing the circle.  As Nobita hangs onto the pterosaur, Kyu is attempting to fly to reach and rescue Nobita, but Kyu is struggling immensely. As Kyu tries and tries, Kyu is slowly evolving as he starts to flap his wings and after multiple tries Kyu was able to fly. Kyu rescues Nobita right after Nobita lets go due to exhaustion. From gliding to flapping, from dinosaurs to birds, Jill and his colleagues marvel at the birth of history as the first step in evolution. The dinosaurs were rescued and settled on the island, and Nobita and his friends said goodbye to Kyu and Myu. Jill exaggerates the caring heart like the dinosaur that formed the wings and the man who created so many emotions in the appearance of such a party. After returning to the current era, Nobita challenges himself to a bar reversal that he could not do, and eventually succeeds.

Cast

Release
It was originally scheduled for release in Japan on 6 March 2020. However, due to the COVID-19 pandemic in Japan, the film was delayed to 7 August 2020.

Box office 
Debuting on 377 screens with limitations on seating capacity due to COVID-19 pandemic, Doraemon: Nobita's New Dinosaur earned $3.9million on 334,000 admissions in its first weekend and ranked number-one on Japanese box office. It grossed $33,942,341 at the box office.

Here is a table which shows the box office of this movie of all the weekends in Japan:

Soundtrack
The theme songs are “Birthday” and "A Monologue with you" by Mr.Children.

See also 

 List of Doraemon films

References

External links
 

2020 films
2020 anime films
2020 fantasy films
2020 science fiction films
Animated films about dinosaurs
Animated films about time travel
Anime postponed due to the COVID-19 pandemic
Dinosaurs in anime and manga
Nobita's New Dinosaur
Japanese fantasy adventure films
Japanese science fiction adventure films
Films about evolution
Films postponed due to the COVID-19 pandemic
Films scored by Takayuki Hattori
Toho animated films
Films about impact events